Roland Conrad Petersen (born 1926) is a Danish-born American painter, printmaker, and professor. His career spans over 50 years, primarily in the San Francisco Bay Area and is perhaps best-known for his "Picnic series" (a yearly event at UC Davis) beginning in 1959 to today. He is part of the Bay Area Figurative Movement.

Early life and education 
Petersen was born 1926 in Endelave, Denmark. He received a B.A. in 1949 and M.A. degree in 1950 from the University of California at Berkeley (UC Berkeley), where he studied under Chiura Obata, John Haley, and Glen Wessels. He continued his studies at California School of Fine Arts (now known as San Francisco Art Institute), the Hans Hofmann School of Fine Arts in Provincetown (from 1950 to 1951), California College of Arts and Crafts (1952 to 1954), and Atelier 17 with Stanley Hayter (from 1963, and 1970 to 1971).

After graduation college in 1950, Petersen made his way east to study with Hans Hoffman School of Fine Arts in Provincetown. Roland would return again the following summer of 1951 after a sojourn in Europe studying for six months with the printmaker Stanley William Hayter. Vestiges of Hofmann's approach, including his conviction that "every deep artistic expression is a product of a conscious feeling for reality," are present in Petersen's works of the early 1950s. It was Hoffman's teaching that showed Petersen how to incorporate "recognizable, everyday objects into this theory of opposition push/pull" a theory, which stresses the applying and combining of opposing forces in art.

Teaching and career 
He taught painting at Washington State University from 1956 to 1992; and painting and printmaking at University of California, Davis from 1956 to 1991.

He won a Guggenheim Fellowship in 1963; and a Fulbright Fellowship to France in 1970.

In March 2010, Petersen's work was the subject of a major retrospective ("Roland Petersen: 50 Years of Painting") held at the Monterey Museum of Art in Monterey, California. Petersen, his daughter, and his wife, the photographer Caryl Ritter, were present. In 2016 a one man show In Perspective was held at his current gallery The Studio Shop Gallery in Burlingame, California, and again on September 22 – October 15, 2017—the show is called Six Decades of Painting—resulting in a bound book of Petersen's work under the same title.

Roland Petersen was a part of the Bay Area Figurative Movement—a mid-20th Century art movement made up of a group of artists in the San Francisco Bay Area who abandoned working in the prevailing style of Abstract Expressionism in favor of a return to figuration in painting during the 1950s and onward into the 1960s. The "Bridge Generation" (the second of three generations) included the artists Roland Petersen, Nathan Oliveira, Theophilus Brown, Paul Wonner, John Hultberg, and Frank Lobdell.

Collections 

 Davis Arts Center, Davis, California
Manetti Shrem Museum of Art, Davis, California
 Hirshhorn Museum and Sculpture Garden, Washington, D.C.
 Fine Arts Museums of San Francisco, (Achenbach Foundation for Graphic Arts), San Francisco, California
 Virginia Museum of Fine Arts, Richmond, Virginia
 Crocker Art Museum, Sacramento, California
 University of Nevada, Reno, Nevada
 Wesleyan University School of Art, Bloomington, Illinois 
 Long Beach Museum of Art, Long Beach, California
 Sacramento City College, Sacramento, California
 Fine Arts Gallery of San Diego, San Diego, California
 Monterey Museum of Art, Monterey, California
 Musée Municipal, Brest, France
 Museum of Contemporary Art, San Diego, California
 Oakland Museum of California, Oakland, California
 Philadelphia Museum of Art, Philadelphia, Pennsylvania
 Phoenix Art Museum, Phoenix, Arizona
 San Francisco Museum of Modern Art (SFMoMA), San Francisco, California
 De Young Museum, San Francisco, California
 Santa Barbara Museum of Art, Santa Barbara, California
 Museum of Modern Art (MoMA), New York City, New York
 Whitney Museum of American Art, New York City, New York

Selected solo exhibitions 

2017    Roland Petersen: Six Decades of Painting, Studio Shop Gallery, Burlingame, CA
2016    Roland Petersen: In Perspective, Studio Shop Gallery, Burlingame, CA 
2015	Works On Paper 1959–1969, Elliott Fouts Gallery, Sacramento, CA
2013	A Journey Through Time, Elliott Fouts Gallery, Sacramento, CA
2008	Roland Petersen: A Natural Order, Hackett-Freedman Gallery, San Francisco, CA
2002    Roland Petersen: Early Paintings 1958-–1969, Hackett-Freedman Gallery, San Francisco, CA
2001	Roland Petersen: Recent Works, John Natsoulas Gallery, Sacramento, CA 
1998	Roland Petersen: Recent Works, John Natsoulas Gallery, Sacramento, CA
1998    Endelave Museum, Endelave, Denmark (traveled throughout Denmark)
1995	Roland Petersen: Recent Works, Maxwell Galleries, San Francisco, CA
1993	Roland Petersen: Works on Paper, Harcourts Modern and Contemporary Art, San Francisco, CA 
1992	Retrospective, University of California, Davis, Richard L. Nelson Gallery, University of California, Davis, CA
1991	Roland Petersen: Works on Paper, Harcourts Modern and Contemporary Art, San Francisco, CA
1990	Roland Petersen: Bay Area Paintings of the Sixties, Vanderwoude Tananbaum Gallery, New York, NY 
1989	Roland Petersen: Works on Paper, Harcourts Modern and Contemporary Art, San Francisco, CA
1987	Roland Petersen—Bay Area Paintings of the Sixties, Vanderwoude/Tananbaum Gallery, New York, NY
1985	Roland Petersen: Encaustic Paintings, Rorick Gallery, San Francisco, CA  
1984	Roland Petersen: Selected Monotypes & Watercolors, Smith Andersen Gallery, Palo Alto, CA
1981–83 Roland Petersen: Encaustic Paintings, Rorick Gallery, San Francisco, CA 
1980	University of Reading, Reading, England 
1979	Brubaker Gallery, Sarasota, FL
1978	Roland Petersen Retrospective, University of California, Davis, Memorial Union Art Gallery, University of California, Davis, CA
1977	Aberbach Fine Arts Gallery, London, England. Kathryn Markel Gallery, New York, NY. University of Reading, Reading, England
1976	20 Year Retrospective of Color Prints by Roland Petersen, Washington State Art 	Services Program (traveling, organized by the Museum of Art), Pullman, WA
1975	Adele Bednarz Gallery, Los Angeles, CA 
1973	Santa Barbara Museum of Art, Santa Barbara, CA. Adele Bednarz Gallery, Los Angeles, CA
1972	Phoenix Art Museum, Phoenix, AZ
1970	Adele Bednarz Gallery, Los Angeles, CA
1968	M.H. de Young Memorial Museum, San Francisco, CA
1967	Staempfli Gallery, New York, NY (also 1965, 1962)
1965	Crocker Art Museum, Sacramento, CA
1961	Esther-Robles Gallery, Los Angeles, CA
1961    California Palace of the Legion of Honor, San Francisco, CA
1954	Oakland Museum of California, Oakland, CA

Selected Group Exhibitions 
2016    Out Our Way, Manetti Shrem Museum of Art, Davis, CA
2002    Geometry Hackett-Freedman Gallery, San Francisco, CA
2001    California Printmakers Association: Group Exhibition, Marin Civic Center, San Rafael, CA                    
1995    Andre Milan Gallery, Sao Paulo, Brazil
1993    Artists Contemporary Gallery, Sacramento, CA 
Pence Gallery, Davis, CA
1992–93 California Painting, The Essential Modernist Framework, Fine Art, CA
State University, Los Angeles, CA; Traveled to University Art Gallery, California State University, San Bernardino, CA
1992    Hall of Pictures, Uman, Russia
California Dreamin', Fresno Metropolitan Museum, Fresno, CA
1990    Northern California Figuration, Natsoulas, Novelozo, Davis, CA
1989    Collectors Exhibit, Sacramento City College, Sacramento, CA
1985    Sacramento/Davis Interface, Richmond Art Center, Richmond, CA
1984–86 Prints U.S.A., First overseas exhibition by the California Society of Printmakers: World Print Council, San Francisco, CA; 
Traveled to the National Museum, Singapore; National Gallery, Bangkok, Thailand; Amerika Haus, Berlin, Germany; Malmo Konsthall, 
Malmo, Sweden; Museo de Arte Carrillo Gil, Mexico
1980    The Collectors Eye, Laguna Beach Museum of Art, Laguna Beach, CA; Traveled to Aberbach Gallery, London, England
1977–78 Atelier 17 Exhibition, Elvehjem Art Center, University of Wisconsin, Madison, WI; traveled to Museum of Art, University of 
Iowa, Iowa City, IA; Brooklyn Museum of Art, Brooklyn, NY; Museum of Art, University of Michigan, Ann Arbor, MI; Krannert Art 
Museum, University of Illinois at Urbana-Champaign, Champaign, IL; Aberbach Fine Arts Gallery, London, England; Kathryn Markel 
Gallery, New York, NY
1972    The American Artist and Water Reclamation, National Gallery of Art, Washington, DC 
1971    Four-Person Exhibition, American Cultural Center, Paris, France
1969    The Illinois Biennial, Krannert Art Museum, University of Illinois at Urbana Champaign, Champaign, IL
1968    The Humanist Tradition with David Park in Contemporary American Painting, New York School, New York, NY. Four Person Exhibition 
with David Park, Elmer Bischoff and Joan Brown, Bednarz and Heritage Gallery, Los Angeles, CA
1966    Contemporary American Artists in the White House, White House, Washington, DC   
1964    Painting and Sculpture Today, Herron Museum of Art, Indianapolis, IN 
1962    68th Denver Annual, Denver Art Museum, Denver, CO
1961    National Watercolor Exhibition, Peoria, IL
1960    First Winter Invitational, California Palace of the Legion of Honor, San Francisco, CA   
1956    San Francisco Art Association Invitational, M.H. De Young Memorial Museum, San Francisco, CA
1955    Second Oil Annual, Seattle Art Museum, Seattle, WA
1954    San Francisco Art Annual, San Francisco Museum of Art, San Francisco, CA 
1951    Atelier 17, New York, NY. American Painters, Florence, Italy. Young Painters, Beaux Gallery, Paris, France
1950    National College Exhibition, Andover, MA

References

External links
 Studio Shop Gallery

1926 births
Living people
20th-century American painters
American male painters
21st-century American painters
21st-century American male artists
University of California, Berkeley alumni
San Francisco Art Institute alumni
California College of the Arts alumni
Washington State University faculty
University of California, Berkeley faculty
University of California, Davis faculty
Danish emigrants to the United States
20th-century American printmakers
People from Burlingame, California
20th-century American male artists
Fulbright alumni